The National Union of Students in Denmark (Danish: Danske Studerendes Fællesråd, DSF), is an umbrella organisation of students' unions at higher education facilities in Denmark. Since 1932, DSF has represented the students of Denmark in matter of education policy.

The 17 membership organizations come from a range of different institutions; from universities to music academies each proportionally represented by mandate. DSF represents approximately 170.000 students, with the majority enrolled in universities.

International work 

DSF, as a member of the European Students' Union, contributes to the advancement of European higher education, often from the perspective of the Bologna Process.

DSF also collaborates with the nordics students’ unions. Similarly, in the Nordic Presidential Meeting (NOM), where also students from Greenland is represented, DSF takes part in the sharing of national experiences and discus larger trends in the international development of the sector.

Membership Organizations 

The 17 member organizations vary in scope and priorities, and thus participate in the national student politics of DSF differently. As of 2020, the member organizations are:

 Syddanske Studerende ved Syddansk Universitet, Odense
 CBS Students ved Copenhagen Business School (CBS)
 Elevrådet ved Det Fynske Kunstakademi
 De Studerendes Råd ved Det Jyske Musikkonservatorium
 De Studerendes Råd ved Designskolen Kolding]
 De Studerendes Råd ved Det Kgl. Danske Kunstakademi - Billedkunstskolerne
 De Studerendes Råd ved Det Kgl. Danske Kunstakademis Skoler for Arkitektur, Design og Konservering (KADK)
 De Studerendes Råd ved Det Kgl. Danske Musikkonservatorium (DKDM)
 Studenterrådet ved Københavns Universitet
 Studenterrådet ved Aarhus Universitet
 Studenterrådet ved Roskilde Universitet
 Studentersamfundet ved Aalborg Universitet
 Polyteknisk Forening ved Danmarks Tekniske Universitet
 Student Political Union at IT University ved IT-universitetet
 De Studerendes Råd (Vitus Bering) ved Ingeniørhøjskolen i Horsens
 De Arkitektstuderendes Råd ved Arkitektskolen Aarhus
 De Studerendes Råd ved Rytmisk Musikkonservatorium

References

External links 

 

Student organizations in Denmark
Groups of students' unions
Education in Denmark